Sandra Brener Rosenthal (born September 27, 1936) is an American philosopher and former Provost Distinguished Professor of Philosophy at Loyola University New Orleans. She is a former president of the Metaphysical Society of America (1996).

Books
C. I. Lewis in Focus: The Pulse of Pragmatism, Indiana University Press, 2007
 Charles Peirce's Pragmatic Pluralism (SUNY Series in Philosophy) 
 Mead and Merleau-Ponty: Toward A Common Vision 
 Rethinking Business Ethics: A Pragmatic Approach (The Ruffin Series in Business Ethics) 
 Speculative Pragmatism 
 Pragmatism and Phenomenology: A Philosophic Encounter 
 Time, Continuity, and Indeterminacy: A Pragmatic Engagement with Contemporary Perspectives 
 Pragmatic a Priori

References

20th-century American philosophers
Philosophy academics
1936 births
Presidents of the Metaphysical Society of America
Living people
American women philosophers
Loyola University New Orleans faculty
20th-century American women
21st-century American women
Distinguished professors of philosophy